Aditiya Daffa Al-Haqi (born 11 January 2004) is an Indonesian professional footballer who plays as a central midfielder for Liga 1 club Barito Putera.

Club career

Barito Putera
He was signed for Barito Putera to play in Liga 1 in the 2020 season. Daffa made his first-team debut on 4 September 2021 in a match against Persib Bandung at the Indomilk Arena, Tangerang.

Career statistics

Club

Notes

Honours

International 
Indonesia U-16
 AFF U-16 Youth Championship third place: 2019

References

External links
 Aditiya Daffa at Soccerway
 Aditiya Daffa at Liga Indonesia

2004 births
Living people
Indonesian footballers
PS Barito Putera players
Liga 1 (Indonesia) players
Indonesia youth international footballers 
Association football midfielders
Sportspeople from Jakarta